Anal sphincterotomy is a surgical procedure that involves treating mucosal fissures from the anal canal/sphincter. The word is formed from sphincter + otomy (to cut, to separate).

Procedure
 The surgery can be performed under any kind of anesthesia.
 After anesthesia is administered, the area is cleaned with an antiseptic solution.
 The sphincter is separated either by simply stretching or cutting. Cutting the muscle prevents spasm and temporarily weakens the muscles. Both methods help the underlying area to heal.
 Remove the fissure and any underlying scar tissue.
 Suture back the wound.

See also
 Lateral internal sphincterotomy
 List of surgeries by type

References

Digestive system surgery